Tsuneko Taniuchi (谷内恒子 Taniuchi Tsuneko), born in Nishinomiya, Hyōgo, Japan, in 1946, is a contemporary artist, who uses performance as her main medium. Her practice, which oscillates between scripted situations and participatory works, aims to question cultural, social, and sexual constructions, linked to notions of identity, immigrations, and feminism.

Education and early works 
After studying 20th-century Western art history and sociology at the of Kobe Jogakuin, Japan, Tsuneko Taniuchi studied at the Beaux-Arts de Paris (France) for two years between (1970–1972). From 1983 to 1987, she travelled extensively between New York, Paris, and Japan (Kobe, Tokyo), before settling permanently in France in 1987. Her early works focused first on paintings, and then on installations, including photographs, and videos.

Works 
In 1995, she began her performance work, which she sees as a series of "micro-events." This term refers to the personal dimension of her actions, in relation to contemporary society and politics, in  which she is generally the main performer alone or she directs a team of often female dancers, performers, actors, etc. The situations she sets up are the result of an intersection between the viewer, the art work and the artist with political and social questioning.

"Micro-Events /Weddings" series 
Initiated in 2002 at the Galerie Jennifer Flay in Paris.

Since 2002, the date France adopted the PACS - Civil Solidarity Pact, allowing same-sex  couples to embrace a form of union close to civil marriage, Taniuchi has developed a new series of Micro-Events called "Micro-Events/Weddings." Their aim is to question, through a variation of contexts, the social norms surrounding marriage; to this date, she has "married" more than two hundred ninety people, men, women, all sexes and genders, and sometimes with several people at once.

Micro-Events /Daily Resistance 
A selection of her performance series of her micro-events from 1995 to 2010, were exhibited at Le Générateur in 2011. The exhibition was conceived as a retrospective of the forty-one micro-events, created since 1995. The event combined the staging of previous performances reactivated by the artist and by women dancers/performers, narrations by actors of certain micro-events, and the exhibitions of video archives.

A monograph was also devoted to this series, distributed by R-Diffusion.

Micro-event 45 
She has repeatedly questioned the role and image of women in contemporary society, through a practice of disguise that take in socially determined contexts, as is the case with her performance "Micro-Event n°45 /Six Female Characters + A Women / Seven days" where she played the female roles of waitress, boxer, gymnast, homeless woman, Ganguro, and Ninja.

More recently, her work has involved other performers—dancers, actors— around themes related to multiculturalism, postcolonialism and intersectional feminism.

Exhibitions and performances (selection)

2010-2020 
2020
 Micro-Event n°51 /It's the body as subjectivity. Le Générateur, Gentilly, France, 6 March.

2019
 Flower Bed, London East Asia Film Festival, (Film & Art), Tate Modern, Starr Cinema, London, UK, 26 October (cat. LEAFF2019).
 Lignes de vies - une exposition de légendes, curated by Frank Lamy, MAC VAL – Musée d’art contemporain du Val-de-Marne, France, 30 March – 25 August.
 Micro-Event 50 /My Body Is Political - Emily Harvey Foundation, New York, NY, 17–18 May.
 Hors Pistes 14e Édition, L’odeur de la lune vague après la Pluie, Judith Cahen and Masayasu Eguchi, Centre Pompidou, Paris, 2 February.

2018
 Micro-Event 50 /My Body Is Political, Le Générateur, Gentilly and  Musée d’art et d’histoire de Saint -Denis, France, 17 November & December 2.
 Micro-Event /Weddings Anniversary (installation), Quel Amour !? MP1-8, curated Eric Corne, Mac, Musée d’art contemporain de Marseille, France, 5 May – 2 September.

2017
 Micro-Event n°49 /Space Oddity – The Artist and Her Studio, Traversées Ren@rde, curated by Damien Sausset, Julie Crenn, Nadège Piton & Erik Noulette, Transpalette, Bourges, France, 21 October – 28 January 2018 (performance: 16 December).
 Micro-Event n°49 /Space Oddity – The Artist and Her Studio, Emily Harvey Foundation, NYC, 27 October (performance & screening).
 Herstory, des archives à l’heure des postféminismes, curated by Julie Crenn &  Pascal Lievre, Maison des arts – centre d’art contemporain de Malakoff, France, 21 January – 19 March.
 Micro-Event n°6 bis /Fast Food – Sushi Merguez, La Nuit européenne des musées 2017, 2 May, curated by Frank Lamy & Julie Crenn, MAC VAL – Musée d’art contemporain du Val-de-Marne, in the exhibition Tous, des sang-mêlés, France, 24 April – 3 September.

2016
 Micro-Events 1995–2015, Légende, curated by Lauren Buffet for FRAC Franche-Comté, Besançon, France, 5 February – 7 May.
 Micro-Event n°49 /Space Oddity – The Artist and Her Studio, Le Générateur, Gentilly, France, 9 October.

2015
 Micro-Event n°44 /Theater of the (Re)presentation of Self, after "Fresh Acconci, Les lanceurs d’alerte – Carte Blanche à Sylvie Blocher, Mudam, Luxembourg, Luxembourg, 7 February.
 L’Effet Vertigo Parcours #7–New Hanging of Works from the Collection, Musée d’art contemporain du Val-de-Marne, Vitry–sur–Seine, France, 24.10.2015–2017.
 Micro-événement N° 14 /Love me tender, L’Effet Vertigo Parcours #7–New Hanging of Works from the Collection, 2002. 20 framed color photographs, 29.5 × 20.5 cm (each). MAC VAL Collection, 2011.

2014
 Tsuneko Taniuchi Micro-Events, solo exhibit, Ginza Maison Hermès, Le Forum, Tokyo, Japan, July18–September 21.
 Micro-Event n°46 /Weddings in Tokyo, Ginza Maison Hermès Le Forum, Tokyo, Japan, 8 August.
 Micro-Event n°45 /Six Female Characters + A Woman / Seven Days, Ginza Maison Hermès, Le Forum, Tokyo, Japan, July18–September 21.

2012
 Situation(s) [48°47 34 N / 2°23 14 E], curated by Frank Lamy, MAC VAL – Musée d’Art Contemporain du Val-de- Marne, France, 30 June–23 September.
 Micro-Event n°42 /Weddings in the Summer Gardens, Situation(s) [48°47 34 N / 2°23 14 E], curated by Frank Lamy, MAC VAL – Musée d’Art Contemporain du Val-de-Marne, France, 1 July.
 Micro-Event n°25 /Public communication bar / VIPCocktails, Neon. La materia lumino- sa dell’arte, curated by David Rosenberg & Bartolomeo Pietromarchi, MACRO – Museum of Contemporary Art of Rome, Italy, 6 June.

2011
 Micro-Events /Daily Resistances, Le Générateur, Gentilly, France, 22 October – 30 October.
 Micro-Event n°41 /Flower Bed, Nuit Blanche, curated by Alexia Fabre and Frank Lamy, Hôtel Amour, Paris, 1 October.

2010
 Micro-Event /Weddings Anniversary, Rendez-vous du forum, Session 2, Centre Georges Pompidou, Paris, 2010 – CNAP Collection 2013.

2000-2010 
2009
 Micro-Event n°13, La Force de l’Art 02, Grand Palais, Paris, 30 May. 15 April 24–June 1.
 Micro-Event n°36 /Ice Vitrine, Lilith Performance Studio, Malmö, Sweden, 13 February.
 Micro-Event n°5 /Nine Female Characters + Queen Béatrice, tijdenstefaf, organized with Nadja Vilenne Gallery, Theater aan het Vrijthof, Maastricht, Netherlands, 8 March – 16 March.

2007
 Feminist Art Base, Elizabeth A. Sackler Center for Feminist Art, curated by Maura Reilly, Brooklyn Museum, Brooklyn, New York.
 Micro-Event n°25 /Public communication bar / VIPCocktails, invited by Nadja Vilenne Gallery, Art Brussels, Brussels, Belgium, 19 April.

2006
 Micro-Event n°18bis Marianne, La Force de l’Art 01, curated by Hou Hanru, Grand Palais, Paris, 10 May – 25 June.

2005
 Micro-Event n°26 /I Get Married in Chinese, Miss China Beauty Gallery, Paris, 8 February – 28 February.
 Micro-Event n°25 /Public communication bar / VIPCocktails, Scènes de vie, Swiss Cultural Centre, Paris, 30 October – 18 December.

2004
 Micro-Event n°24 /Weddings, Liverpool Biennial, Liverpool Biennial,  Tate Liverpool, Independents district, Liverpool, 18 September–November 28.
 Micro-Event n°25 /Public communication bar / VIPCocktails, Occupations #1, MAC VAL- Musée d’art contemporain du Val-de-Marne, France, 22 October – 24 October.

2003
 Micro-Event n°21 /Marriage Candidates, Intimités, Hôtel de Ville, Paris, 7 March – 9 March.

2002
 Micro-Event n°14 /Future Bride Likes to Paint, Art & Vitrine, Rougier & Plé, Paris, 15 January – 1 February.
 Micro-Event n°14 /Love Me Tender, Sens Dessus-Dessous, Galerie Jennifer Flay, Paris, 26 January – 3 February.

2001
 Micro-Event n°11 /Tsuneko Troc, Tokyorama, curated by Nicolas Bourriaud and Jérôme Sans, Palais de Tokyo, Paris, 1 September – 30 September.
 Micro- Event n°11 /Tsuneko Troc, in Arts d’Attitudes, Le Lieu, Québec, (France au Québec / La saison), organized by l’AFAA et Le Lieu, 6 September – 8 September.
 Micro- Event n°9 bis /A Female Boxer, Je ne suis pas une Pénélope, Espace Culturel François Mitterrand, Beauvais, France, 18 November – 13 January.
 Micro-Event n°6 /Berlin / Fast Food, Künstlerhaus Bethanien, Berlin, (Villa Médicis Hors les Murs 2000/AFAA), 21 October.
 Ganguro Girl, Les Revues parlées – Machines, Centre Georges Pompidou, Paris, 15 December.
 Micro-Event n°12 /The Right to Housing, Rewind, Glassbox, Paris, March–21 April.

2000
 Micro-Event n°5 /Nine Female Characters, Paris pour escale, curated by Hou and Evelyne Jouanno, Museum of Modern Art of the City of Paris, 7 December – 18 February 2001.

1980-2000 
1999
 Micro-Event n°5 /Nine Female Characters, Transpalette, Bourges, France, 9 October – 7 November.
 Expériences du divers, Galerie Art & Essai / Université Rennes 2, Rennes, France, 18 May – 26 June.

1998  
 Passeurs, Centre national de la Photographie, curated by Julie Sauerwein and Adriaan Himmelreich, Paris, 29 April – 6 June.
 Gare de l’Est, curated by Hou Hanru and Enrico Lunghi, Casino Luxembourg / Forum d’art contemporain, Luxembourg, 12 December – 21 February 1999.
 Ici, ailleurs et nulle part, Quartier Éphémère, Montreal, Canada, 21 November – 20 December (exhibition-residency)
 Micro-Event n°20 /How to Become a Good Housewife, Ici, ailleurs et nulle part, Quartier Éphémère, Montreal, Canada, 21 November.

1997
 Parisien(ne)s, curated by Hou Hanru, and organized by Iniva in collaboration with Camden Arts Centre, 7 February – 23 March.

1995
 Micro-Event n°1 /Ato No Matsuri /Too Late, Chez Valentin Gallery, Paris, 8 July.
 You are not invited / Collection de Nora, Heart Gallery, Paris, 21 November – 13 December.
 Strangers in Paradise (Étrangères au Paradis), curated by Michel Nuridsany, Le monde de l'art, Paris, 11 April – 27 May.

1994
 Chaque génération paye les erreurs de la précédente, curated by Hou Hanru, Hôpital Éphémère, Paris, 8 January – 9 January.

1991
 Il reste toujours une place, Credit Agricole gallery, Poitiers, France, 8 October – 31 October.

1989
 Galerie du Triangle, Bordeaux, France.

1986
 Galerie Moris, Tokyo, Japan.

1983
 Jack Tilton Gallery, New York.

References

External links
 Artist website
 Interview with Tsuneko Taniuchi
 Artist profile on Asian Women Artist datebase

1946 births
Living people
20th-century Japanese women artists
20th-century Japanese artists
21st-century Japanese women artists
21st-century Japanese artists
Artists from Hyōgo Prefecture
Japanese performance artists